The Uttara Ganabhaban is an 18th-century (1734) royal palace also known as Dighapatia Palace as it was formerly the seat of the Dighapatia Raj, an aristocratic landed estate in the East Bengal of India. It is a fine example of a jomidar bari (country house). It was built by Raja Doyaram who was the Dewan (minister) of Rani Bhavanee. It has a round clock on its front gate with a large bell and a clock room. The clock was imported from Italy. It also has a beautiful garden full of various foreign trees and Italian marble stone statues of women. It is located near Natore town in North Bengal. It serves as the principal residence of the Bangladeshi Prime Minister in the northern part of the country. It has been used as a ceremonial site for receiving foreign ambassadors.

History 

There has been a house on the site since the early 18th century, when the Nawab of Bengal rewarded Dayaram Roy for suppressing a rebellion. Roy was awarded the title of Jagirdar and given the zamindari of vast tracts of land in Jessore, Rajshahi, Bogra and Mymensingh. When the British Empire enforced the permanent settlement in Bengal, the Roys were recognised as landed Maharajas. They were avid followers of European influence, fashion, art, and culture. Their palace was developed on the outskirts of Natore in the 19th century. The town of Natore served as the headquarters of Rajshahi Division in the Bengal Presidency, and thus was an important administrative centre. Following Partition in 1947, the estate was formally abolished during major land reforms in East Bengal.

On 24 July 1967, it was designated as a gubernatorial residence by Abdul Monem Khan, the Governor of East Pakistan. The palace was used by President Ayub Khan as a retreat when Bangladesh was a part of Pakistan as its eastern wing. After the independence of Bangladesh, Prime Minister Sheikh Mujibur Rahman, the founding father of the Bangladeshi republic, declared the palace as his official residence in northern Bangladesh on 9 February 1972. It has since been used by successive Bangladeshi heads of government for holding cabinet, political and diplomatic meetings outside the capital.

Uttara Ganabhaban Museum 
Uttara Ganabhaban Museum is located in Uttara Ganabhaban of Natore district. The museum was established on March 9, 2018. At least one hundred items of historical interest have been found in the archives at Uttara Ganobhaban. Cabinet Secretary Mohammad Shafiul Alam inaugurated the museum.

Gallery

See also
 Chequers Court
 List of archaeological sites in Bangladesh

References

Natore District
Official residences in Bangladesh
Prime ministerial residences
Palaces in Bangladesh
Indo-Saracenic Revival architecture